Die Ärzte is a German rock band from Berlin. The band has released 14 studio albums. The group consists of guitarist Farin Urlaub, drummer Bela B and bass player Rodrigo González. All three write and perform their songs.

History

Early years 
Die Ärzte were formed in West Berlin in 1982 by Jan Vetter (alias Farin Urlaub, a pun on the expression "Fahr' in Urlaub", meaning "Go on vacation"), Dirk Felsenheimer (alias Bela B, referring to Dracula actor Bela Lugosi) and bassist Hans Runge, alias . Bela and Farin had previously played together in the punk band Soilent Grün, established in 1979 and named after the film Soylent Green.

After Soilent Grün broke up in 1982, Bela and Farin decided to form another band. In the first two years (including Sahnie) they mostly played in clubs in their hometown, Berlin. Their first release was a contribution to the sampler 20 schäumende Stimmungshits (rough translation: "20 foamy party hits"), featuring a strong alcohol theme (for example, the chorus of "Vollmilch" translates as "you drink whiskey, he drinks beer, I drink milk"). In 1983 they won a rock contest in Berlin and with the prize money they recorded their debut EP Uns geht's prima... ("We're doing great..."). Finally CBS signed them, and they released their first LP Debil ("Moronic") in 1984 then their second Im Schatten der Ärzte ("In the shadow of Die Ärzte") a year later.

After the second album they parted ways with Sahnie due to internal problems. He was replaced by producer Manne Praeker on the third album. Later, Hagen Liebing ("The Incredible Hagen") played bass for them until their breakup, although he never became an official member of the band. The third album was also the first time that Farin used distorted guitar sounds on most of the album, moving the band's sound towards rock. In 1987 the German Federal Centre for Media Harmful to Young Persons put the songs "Geschwisterliebe" ("Sibling love", a song about incest, from the eponymous album Die Ärzte), "Claudia hat 'nen Schäferhund" ("Claudia has a German Shepherd", about zoophilia, from Debil) and "Schlaflied" ("Lullaby", about a monster coming and eating its victim after falling asleep, also from Debil) on the German List of Media Harmful to Young People (often called "the Index"). 
This prohibited the band from performing the songs live or promoting the two albums and, more importantly, shops were prohibited from openly displaying these records on their shelves. At their concerts they circumvented the ban by playing only the music of the prohibited songs, while the audience sang the lyrics. After several trials against shops that still openly sold the records, a lot of shops completely removed Die Ärzte from their stock. The result was a drop in record sales and financial problems for the band. In response they released the best of album Ist das alles? ("Is that all?") with three new songs and the 10" compilation Ab 18 (Adults only) containing all indexed songs and some other songs with controversial, mainly sex-themed lyrics. Although advice not to sell the album to minors was printed on the cover, Ab 18 was also put on the index.

The inner sleeve was put on the index separately because it contained the lyrics. Some tour posters were considered misogynistic and were also put on the list. They contained a drawing of a tied up and gagged woman called Gwendoline that was inspired by bondage artist John Willie and is the mascot of the band. Since then, Die Ärzte have used a skeleton version of Gwendoline in the artwork of most of their albums.
Later, from 2000 on, live shows have featured two oversized Gwendolines that flank the stage (especially at outdoor concerts). The commissioned artist had first colored the figures independently. However, after the Hard Pop Days were played with these colorful editions and a houseboat at Popkomm in Cologne was adorned with them, they were recolored into classic black and white design.

The following album Das ist nicht die ganze Wahrheit... ("That is not the whole truth...") was even more successful and got into the top 10 of the German album charts. Die Ärzte decided to go out on a high note and split up after doing one last tour and releasing a triple live album, Nach uns die Sintflut ("Devil may care", lit. "After us the deluge"), later released as a double CD, that became their first number one in the album charts.

Reunion 

Neither Farin's new band King Køng nor Bela's Depp Jones became successful, so in 1993 they decided to reform. They invited former Depp Jones guitarist Rodrigo González to take over on bass duties. They released the comeback album Die Bestie in Menschengestalt ("The beast in human form") and the single "Schrei nach Liebe" ("Cry for love"), their first song to have political lyrics. It was recorded as a statement against the increasing racism and right-wing extremist violence in Germany at that time. The translation of the song's refrain is "Your violence is just a silent cry for love / Your combat boots are craving for tenderness / You never learned to express yourself / And your parents never had time for you / Oh oh oh asshole". The album was more varied than previous releases, including ballads, punk, rock and even a song resembling Volksmusik. Both the album and single became big hits in Germany, Austria and Switzerland. The follow-up Planet Punk was also very successful.

In 1996 they wanted to make an EP just about hair, however, they wrote too many songs for an EP and it became their next album, Le Frisur. It was not as successful as its predecessors. Also during this year, as well as touring in their own right, they also supported Kiss — a dream come true for Bela and Rod. In 1998 their single "Männer sind Schweine" ("Men are pigs") became their first number 1 single in Germany, Austria and Switzerland, with the album 13 also being number 1 in Germany and Switzerland. After a lot of promotion and touring that year, they decided to take a break and also to never again play "Männer sind Schweine" during concerts, due in part to its huge chart success, which in turn attracted remakes, e.g. "Frauen sind Schweine" ("Women are pigs").

Recent years 
In 2000 they came back with the album, Runter mit den Spendierhosen, Unsichtbarer! ("Stop feeling so generous, invisible one!", lit.: "Down with the generosity trousers, invisible one!"), and two top 10 singles. For the third single from the album they released the 30-second-song Yoko Ono, which, according to the Guinness Book of Records, is the shortest single ever released (with a videoclip)—another example of their sense of humour. During their tour in 2001 they sold the limited edition album 5, 6, 7, 8 - Bullenstaat! ("5,6,7,8 – Cop State!") consisting of short punk songs that were written and recorded with the previous years full-length album published a year before, and with some cover songs that were published in 1995 (another tour only EP).

After that they again took a break: Bela did some acting and Farin recorded his first solo album Endlich Urlaub! ("Holiday at last!"). In late 2002 they did an MTV Unplugged session in a school auditorium with the school's band (Albert Schweitzer Gymnasium, Hamburg, Germany) which they released under the title Rock'n'Roll Realschule (in allusion to the Ramones' song and the film Rock 'n' Roll High School). The following year they released a new two-CD album, Geräusch ("Noise"). In December 2003 a live DVD was recorded and published the following year.

While the band was on another break, Farin released another solo album Am Ende der Sonne ("At the end of the Sun"). In 2005 a new version of the album Debil was released under the name Devil containing the original track listings plus some B-sides and previously unreleased bonus material. The album can now be sold legally, since all the tracks have been removed from the Index. In 2006, Bela B made a solo album, Bingo. On 2 November 2007, Die Ärzte released their latest album, Jazz ist anders ("Jazz is nothing like this", lit. "Jazz is different"), which was preceded by the single Junge ("Boy"). Junge was shown for the first time on MTV TRL Germany on 14 September 2007. The album was followed by two tours, in winter 2007 and summer 2008.

After they played a few concerts in 2009, they took the longest break since the reunion. In April 2011 they toured under the pseudonym "Laternen-Joe".

Die Ärzte announced a new studio album, to be released on 13 April 2012 and a tour from May to August.
The first single from the upcoming album was released (as an EP with 3 additional tracks) on 2 March and is called "zeiDverschwÄndung" ("wÄste of time").

In June 2019, the band played a club tour in non-German speaking parts of Europe before headlining the festivals Rock am Ring and Rock im Park. They were their first live shows since 2013.

Relationship with Die Toten Hosen 
Throughout their career, Die Ärzte have often been compared to fellow German punk band Die Toten Hosen; a comparison that has often been stylized as a rivalry by the media despite both bands never having an official feud. The comparisons are mostly drawn because of a similar origin as both bands were pioneers of the German punk rock scene and started around the same time in the early 1980s, in both cases evolving from earlier locally famous punk bands (Die Ärzte from Soilent Grün and Die Toten Hosen from ZK). Furthermore, both bands are heavily linked to their cities of origin: Die Ärzte from Berlin and Die Toten Hosen from Düsseldorf. While Die Ärzte are known as the first famous Fun Punk band of Germany, Die Toten Hosen also have a bunch of humorous songs, mostly about alcoholism. Both bands enjoyed a similar curve of success (with the most notable difference being the 5-year hiatus of Die Ärzte). Due to all these similarities multiple media outlets in Germany tried to establish a Beatles/Stones-style rivalry between both bands even though both bands are amicable towards each other if not poking fun at said "rivalry". Adopting aliases Die Ärzte and Die Toten Hosen have played small club shows together in the past. In 2012 Die Toten Hosen even covered Die Ärzte's Schrei nach Liebe on the bonus disc for their album Ballast der Republik. The same year, they covered the song while headlining Germany's biggest rock festival Rock am Ring. Poking fun at the two bands sometimes being confused, Die Toten Hosen frontman Campino said that "maybe the people just want to hear a good song this time".

Band name 

The band name "Die Ärzte" was decided upon after Farin Urlaub and Bela B noticed that the folder with the umlaut "Ä" was empty in most record stores. Since their 2003 album Geräusch, they have stylized their name with three dots over the ä in ärzte, intended as a play on the heavy metal umlaut. While the A with triple-dot diacritic does not represent any real language construct, it can be represented in Unicode as "A⃛" using the combining character U+20DB . 

The three dots also symbolize the three members of the band. The German cartoonist Schwarwel, who also directed music videos for famous pop punk bands including Good Charlotte and Unwritten Law, realized the idea. "Die Ärzte", with two dots, is correct German orthography and not related to the heavy metal umlaut in any way. They often call themselves "Die beste Band der Welt" ("The best band in the world") in jest due to them wondering why they have so many fans. They often change their band name for short periods, sometimes only a matter of days. For example, they called themselves "Die Köche" ("The cooks") to promote their 2007 album "Jazz ist anders" ("Jazz is different"), relevant due to the album art's pizza theme. By adopting new names, the band is able to avoid attracting large crowds, allowing them to hold small concerts.

International reception
The band has been very popular in Germany, Austria and Switzerland, while also enjoying some success in other Northern European countries. Unlike fellow early 1980s German punk band Die Toten Hosen (whose career has often been compared to Die Ärzte, often trying to promote a rivalry), Die Ärzte are largely unknown outside of these countries, aside from descendants of German nationals abroad as well as many students. The band considered releasing an album in English in the mid-1990s, but they dropped the idea. In 2002 they did a short tour in Japan and released a compilation of their last albums there, and in 2004 they did a short tour in South America. Today they are one of the highest grossing live acts in Germany, Austria and Switzerland.

Band members
 Farin Urlaub – vocals, guitar, bass (1982–present)
 Bela B – vocals, drums, guitar (1982–present)
 Rodrigo González – vocals, bass, guitar, piano (1993–present)

Former members
 Hans Runge ("Sahnie") – bass, vocals (1982–1986)
 Hagen Liebing ("The Incredible Hagen") – bass, backing vocals (1986–1988)

Discography

Studio albums
 Debil (1984)
 Im Schatten der Ärzte (1985)
 Die Ärzte (1986)
 Das ist nicht die ganze Wahrheit... (1988)
 Die Bestie in Menschengestalt (1993)
 Planet Punk (1995)
 Le Frisur (1996)
 13 (1998)
 Runter mit den Spendierhosen, Unsichtbarer! (2000)
  5, 6, 7, 8 – Bullenstaat! (2001)
 Geräusch (2003)
 Jazz ist anders (2007)
 auch (2012)
 Hell (2020)
 Dunkel (2021)

Literature

Awards

References

Further reading 
  English translation of the title: "A Colossal Guinea Pig Devours the World".
  English translation of the title: "My Years with 'Die Ärzte'".

External links 

 
German musical trios
German punk rock groups
Deutschpunk
Musical groups established in 1982
Musical groups disestablished in 1988
Musical groups reestablished in 1993
Musical groups from Berlin
World Music Awards winners
Echo (music award) winners
MTV Europe Music Award winners
CBS Records artists
1982 establishments in Germany
Warner Music Sweden artists